Allan Howard Davis (born 27 July 1980) is an Australian former professional road racing cyclist, who last rode for UCI ProTour team . Born in Ipswich, Queensland, Davis resides in Bundaberg, Queensland and in Spain.  Known for his sprinting ability, he started competitive cycling at the age of 10, and turned professional in 2002. He is also the brother of fellow cyclist, Scott Davis, and was an Australian Institute of Sport scholarship holder.

Career
In 2004 and 2005 he participated in the Tour de France, coming fifth in the points classification at the 2005 Tour de France behind the winner, Thor Hushovd of Norway, and fellow Australians Stuart O'Grady (2nd) and Robbie McEwen (3rd), and Kazakh champion Alexander Vinokourov (4th).

In 2006, Davis was one of the riders of the  team implicated in the Operación Puerto doping case. However, on 26 July 2006, Davis was cleared by Spanish officials.

He made his debut with Quick Step on 3 September 2008 in the Memorial Rik Van Steenbergen – Aartselaar race after reaching an agreement with Patrick Lefevere for the following two seasons and obtained a definitive free pass from his former team, Mitsubishi–Jartazi.

His 2009 season got off to an excellent start with three stages and the overall of the 2009 Tour Down Under.

He remained with the team until the end of 2011, when he moved to the new  team.

Davis won gold in the Road Race in the 2010 Commonwealth Games.

Orica–GreenEDGE opted not to renew Davis' contract for 2014. After attempting to find a new team, Davis announced his retirement from competition in February 2014.

In February 2018 Davis joined  as the team's lead directeur sportif.

Major results

2000
 7th Road race, UCI Road World Under-23 Championships
2001
 6th Road race, UCI Road World Under-23 Championships
2002
 1st Stage 1 Giro del Capo
 2nd GP Istria
 3rd Road race, National Under-23 Road Championships
2003
 1st Trofeo Manacor
 1st Stage 4 Circuit Cycliste de la Sarthe
 2nd Road race, National Road Championships
2004
 1st Giro del Piemonte
 1st Trofeo Alcudia
 1st Trofeo Manacor
 1st Stage 5 Deutschland Tour
 5th Overall Tour de Pologne
1st Stage 3 
2005
 Vuelta a Murcia
1st Stages 1, 3 & 5
 Eneco Tour
1st  Points classification
1st Stage 3
 Vuelta a Aragón
1st  Points classification
1st Stage 5
 2nd Overall Tour Down Under
 3rd Paris–Tours
 3rd HEW Cyclassics
2006
 Tour Down Under
1st Stages 2 & 5
 3rd  Road race, Commonwealth Games
2007
 Tour of Qinghai Lake
1st  Points classification
1st Stages 1, 3, 5, 6 & 9
 1st Stage 3 Volta a Catalunya
 2nd Milan–San Remo
2008
 2nd Overall Tour Down Under
1st Stage 3
 2nd Overall Geelong Bay Classic Series
1st Stage 4
 3rd Vattenfall Cyclassics
 4th Overall Tour de Pologne
1st  Points classification
1st Stage 2
2009
 1st  Overall Tour Down Under
1st  Points classification
1st Stages 2, 4 & 5
 2nd Paris–Brussels
 2nd Grand Prix de Wallonie
 4th Milan–San Remo
 4th Vattenfall Cyclassics
2010
 1st  Road race, Commonwealth Games
 1st  Points classification Tour de Pologne
 3rd  Road race, UCI Road World Championships
 5th Vattenfall Cyclassics
2011
 9th Overall Tour Down Under
 10th Cancer Council Helpline Classic
2012
 1st  Overall Geelong Bay Classic Series
 6th Road race, UCI Road World Championships

References

External links

Palmares at Cycling Base

1980 births
Living people
Australian male cyclists
Commonwealth Games bronze medallists for Australia
Commonwealth Games gold medallists for Australia
Cyclists at the 2010 Commonwealth Games
Cyclists at the 2006 Commonwealth Games
Sportspeople from Ipswich, Queensland
Cyclists from Queensland
Australian Institute of Sport cyclists
Commonwealth Games medallists in cycling
Medallists at the 2006 Commonwealth Games
Medallists at the 2010 Commonwealth Games